Following the departure of Ehud Barak from the membership and leadership of the Israeli Labor Party, a leadership election was called.

Election rules
Leadership elections in the Israeli Labor Party happen in a two round vote, with the two leading candidates from the first round advancing into a run-off. If a candidate wins over 40% of the vote in the first round, he wins automatically and the second round is cancelled.

Candidates
4 Candidates ran for Labor leadership in this election:

 Shelly Yachimovich, Labor MK and former journalist. 
 Amir Peretz, Labor MK and former party leader and Minister of Defense.
 Isaac Herzog,  Labor MK and former Minister of Welfare and Social Services
 Amram Mitzna, Labor MK and former party leader and former mayor of Haifa and Yerhuam.

Results

Yachimovich was thus elected leader of the party, becoming the second female leader of the party since Golda Meir, who was elected leader of Mapai in 1969 and automatically became leader of the Labor Party upon the merger of Mapai with Rafi and Ahdut HaAvoda.

References

Israeli Labor Party leadership elections
2011 elections in Israel
Israeli Labor Party leadership election
September 2011 events in Asia